The Baby and the Battleship is a  colour 1956 British comedy film directed by Jay Lewis and starring John Mills, Richard Attenborough and André Morell. It is based on the 1956 novel by Anthony Thorne with a screenplay by Richard De Roy, Gilbert Hackforth-Jones and Bryan Forbes.  The Royal Navy provided much cooperation with sequences filmed aboard HMS Birmingham and in Malta.

Plot
When a group of Royal Navy sailors go ashore on leave in Naples, they go to visit an old friend who is a baker.  He is the father of 12 daughters and, to his great pride and relief, an infant son.  So that one of them can take the eldest daughter out that night, they are required to take the son with them to an outdoor dance. 'Puncher' has a reputation for fighting and drinking and, despite his best efforts to live up to his pledge to reform his behaviour, he is provoked by two sailors from another ship and starts a fight while his friend 'Knocker' is dancing with the eldest daughter.  During the brawl, Puncher Roberts is knocked unconscious while Knocker and the sister run away on the arrival of police, abandoning the baby in the square.  Puncher regains consciousness and finds the square empty, except for the baby.  Unable to find his friend Knocker, or the child's adult sister, he smuggles the baby aboard their ship, leaving a message in chalk on the wharfside telling Knocker he has taken 'Number 13' on board.  He elicits the help of his fellow sailors to care for the baby while hiding it from their superiors, all while in the midst of a series of joint operations with Allied navies off the coast of Italy.  Knocker seeks the help of his rather casual shore-based senior officer but to little avail as the ship also maintains radio silence.  Knocker makes the most of the unexpected time among the baker's extended family which becomes tense as the return of the baby is delayed.  When Puncher's ship is about to have to surrender to superior forces during training exercises, the Captain is able to use the presence of the baby to extricate himself from an embarrassing loss.  The ship returns to port and the entire family is re-united on board.

Cast
 John Mills - Puncher Roberts
 Richard Attenborough - Knocker White
 André Morell - Marshal
 Bryan Forbes - Professor Evans
 Michael Hordern - Captain Hugh
 Ernest Clark - Commander Geoffrey Digby
 Harry Locke - Chief Petty Officer Blades
 Michael Howard - Joe
 Lionel Jeffries - George
 Clifford Mollison - Sails
 Thorley Walters - Lieutenant Setley
 Duncan Lamont - Master-at-Arms
 Lisa Gastoni - Maria
 Cyril Raymond - PMO
 Harold Siddons - Whiskers
 D. A. Clarke-Smith - The Admiral
 Kenneth Griffith - Sub-Lieutenant
 John Le Mesurier -  The Marshal's Aide
 Carlo Giustini - Carlo Vespucci
 Ferdy Mayne - Interpreter
 Vincent Barbi - Second Brother
 Gordon Jackson - Harry
 Vittorio Vittori - Third Brother
 Martyn Garrett - The Baby
 Barry Foster - Sailor at Dance
 Robert Ayres - American Captain
 Sam Kydd Chief Steward

Reception
The Baby and the Battleship was one of the ten most popular films at the British box office in 1956.

References

External links

 Movie review by The New York Times

1956 films
1956 comedy films
British comedy films
Films directed by Jay Lewis
Seafaring films
Films scored by Humphrey Searle
Films set in the Mediterranean Sea
Films based on British novels
Military humor in film
Films about the Royal Navy
1950s English-language films
1950s British films
English-language comedy films